Alexander Montgomery Carlisle, PC (8 July 1854 – 6 March 1926) brother-in-law to Viscount Pirrie, was one of the men involved with designing the s in the shipbuilding company Harland and Wolff. His main area of responsibility was the ships' safety systems such as the watertight compartments and lifeboats. As a Privy Councillor, he was known as "The Right Honorable".

While working on the liners, Carlisle had some minor disputes with Lord Pirrie over the number of lifeboats required for a vessel of this size. Pirrie, the chairman of Harland and Wolff, was satisfied that the number of lifeboats supplied more than met the board of trade regulations. Carlisle then retired and did not have anything more to do with shipbuilding. Thomas Andrews, Pirrie's nephew, was then made master ship builder. Contemporary documentaries claimed Carlisle retired in anger due to Pirrie not accepting his lifeboat recommendations, if his recommendations were accepted the overall death toll of the Titanic’s sinking would be far lower. The Olympic-class liners were the last ships that Carlisle was involved with.

See also
 Thomas Andrews (shipbuilder)

References

Further reading
 
 

British naval architects
1854 births
1926 deaths
Members of the Privy Council of Ireland